AntennaPod is a free and open-source podcast aggregator app for the Android operating system.

History 
AntennaPod was originally released on July 22, 2012, as Version 0.8 and is licensed under the MIT license. The app is a free and open-source software that aggregates podcasts. The app was featured on the crowdsourced BoringPhone—a phone intended to eliminate distractions that is an alternative to the mainstream android phones.

Properties 
 Automatic update, download and streaming of episodes 
 Variable playback speed
 Atom and RSS Feeds (password protected)
 Feed import/export with OPML
 Integration of Flattr
 Searching for podcasts and synchronizing with gpodder service
 Support of MP3, Podlove and VorbisComment chapters
 Support for paged feeds
 Dark theme

Reception 

In December 2015 Android Police named AntennaPod one of their favorite and most used apps in 2015, saying it is a "capable option that looks great" and has all needed features.

In November 2019, Dan Price of Make Use of included AntennaPod as the only open-source player in a list of 8 best podcast applications for Android. He said although it was less well known, it has many good features, including "great memory management tools."

In June 2020, Manuel Vonau of AndroidPolice said open source AntennaPod from F-Droid is a "fine alternative to many proprietary solutions" but its player design could be improved.

In July 2020, Netzwelt listed AntennaPod as their top choice for podcast apps.

According to Jan Spoenle of Weka Media, AntennaPod works as well as its commercial competitors with the only downside of the app being that it doesn't provide an individual playlist function.

Leonardo Banchi of AndroidWorld recommended the application as a free alternative to other podcast apps.

References

External links 

AntennaPod project on GitHub
AntennaPod Support Forum

Podcasting software
Year of introduction missing
Free and open-source Android software